1911 heat wave may refer to:

1911 United Kingdom heat wave
1911 Eastern North America heat wave